Jarosław Wasik (born 1 January 1971 in Prudnik) is a Polish singer-songwriter.

He was educated at the University of Opole and SWPS University of Social Sciences and Humanities in Warsaw. He is currently a director at the Muzeum Polskiej Piosenki in Opole.

Discography

Monographic albums 
 Nastroje (1995)
 Zielony z niebieskim (1997)
 Fabryka Nastrojów (2004)
 Nie dotykaj (13 September 2011)

Singles 
 Po Prostu Pragnę (1997)

Compilation albums 
 Cytryna
 Ballady Ani Niesobskiej do muzyki przyjaciół
 13 poetów (2003)
 Upodobania (2004)
 Miłosne smaki Warszawy (2006)
 Christmas Time – All About Music (16 December 2009)
 W stronę Krainy Łagodności (11 September 2009, 4 July 2011)
 Smooth Jazz Po Polsku (21 April 2010)
 Między ciszą a ciszą 2 (9 October 2012)
 40/40 Ogólnopolskie Spotkania Zamkowe Śpiewajmy Poezję – Wydanie Jubileuszowe (2015)
 Ballady i niuanse. Volume 2 (11 December 2015)
 Między ciszą a ciszą 3 (1 June 2018)

References

External links 
 Jarosław Wasik's official website

1971 births
Living people
People from Prudnik
Sung poetry of Poland
20th-century Polish male  singers
21st-century Polish male singers
21st-century Polish singers